Vulcanite may refer to:

 Vulcanite (mineral), the mineral
 Vulcanite (hard rubber) (aka Ebonite), vulcanized rubber
 Vulcanite (artificial stone), artificial stone

See also
 Vulcanization
 Vulcanoid